The Puerto Rico Classic was a men's professional golf tournament hosted by the Puerto Rico Golf Association and was an event on PGA Tour Latinoamérica from 2012 to 2013.

The tournament was hosted at the Dorado Beach Resort in both years and the inaugural winner of the event was Sebastián Vázquez.

The 2013 Puerto Rico Classic was played over a shortened 54 holes format following severe weather suspensions. This was to be the final running of the tournament as its status was not renewed on the 2014 PGA Tour Latinoamérica schedule.

Winners

Notes

References

PGA Tour Latinoamérica events
Golf tournaments in Puerto Rico
Recurring sporting events established in 2012
Recurring sporting events disestablished in 2013
Defunct sports competitions in Puerto Rico
2012 establishments in Puerto Rico
2013 disestablishments in Puerto Rico